Dunbartonshire and Argyll & Bute is an administrative division of Scotland, used for electoral registration and property valuation; and for the administration of criminal justice social work services. It consists of Argyll and Bute, East Dunbartonshire, and West Dunbartonshire.

Administrative divisions of Scotland
West Dunbartonshire
East Dunbartonshire
Argyll and Bute